Luka Vušković (born 24 February 2007) is a Croatian professional footballer who plays as a centre-back for Croatian Football League club Hajduk Split.

Club career
Born in Split, Vušković progressed through the academy of local side Hajduk Split, becoming the youngest Croatian to play, and to score, in the UEFA Youth League.

He made his unofficial debut at the age of 15, playing in a friendly against Urania in September 2022. On 16 December 2022, he scored in a 4–3 friendly victory over German side Schalke 04.

On 26 February 2023, two days after his sixteenth birthday, Vušković made his professional debut, starting and playing 90 minutes in a league derby match against Dinamo Zagreb, which ended in a 4–0 loss for his side. In the process, he became the youngest player in the Croatian top flight, together with Marko Dabro; he also became the youngest player to ever feature in an Eternal derby game, surpassing Josip Bašić.

On 2 March 2023, Vušković scored the opening goal in Hajduk's 2–1 win over NK Osijek in the quarter finals of the 2022–23 Croatian Football Cup. Scoring at 16 years and 5 days old, he became the youngest goalscorer in the history of Hajduk Split in official matches.

International career
Vušković has represented Croatia at youth international level.

Personal life
Hailing from a footballing family, Vušković's father, Danijel, formerly played for Hajduk Split, and now serves as a coach for the youth team. His grandfather, Mario, played for the youth teams of Hajduk Split during the tenure of Tomislav Ivić, and went on to forge a footballing career in the Netherlands. His great-grandfather, Marko, also played for Hajduk Split during World War II, and went on to work as a club executive.

More recently, his brother, also named Mario, left Hajduk Split for Germany, where he joined Hamburger SV. His cousins, Moreno, who currently plays for Bulgarian side Litex Lovech, and Vito, who currently plays for Rudeš, are also footballers, as was their father, Ronald.

Style of play
Standing at 1.93 m, Vušković has drawn comparisons to former Spanish international Gerard Piqué for his style of play.

Career statistics

Club

Notes

References

External links
 

2007 births
Living people
Footballers from Split, Croatia
Association football central defenders
Croatian footballers
Croatia youth international footballers
HNK Hajduk Split players